Martie is a given name. Notable people with the name include:

Martie Cook, American screenwriter
Martie Cordaro, American businessman
Martie Duncan, American chef, blogger and party planner
Martie Maguire (born 1969), American musician

See also
Marty (disambiguation)